Maria Sole Ferrieri Caputi (born 20 November 1990) is an Italian football referee.

Biography 
Having been born on 20 November 1990 to parents of Apulian origin, Ferrieri Caputi has a bachelor's degree in Political Science and International Relations from the University of Pisa and a master's degree in Sociology from the University of Florence. She is a researcher at the Adapt Foundation (Association for International and Comparative Studies on Labour Law and Industrial Relations) and a doctoral candidate at the University of Bergamo.

Career 
Affiliated to the section of her native city, Livorno, Ferrieri Caputi entered AIA in 2007. In November 2015, she refereed the Levito–Atletico San Paolo Serie D match.

In 2019, she refereed the Torneo di Viareggio tournament and became an international referee. She made her international debut in Scotland–Cyprus, valid for the UEFA Women's Euro 2022 qualifiers.

In 2020, she was promoted to Serie C after five years in Serie D, followed by the VAR room designation for Serie B. On 8 December of that year, she debuted in a match involving Pro Patria and Pro Sesto.

In October 2021, she made her Serie B debut in Cittadella–SPAL. On 15 December of that year, she refereed the Cagliari–Cittadella Coppa Italia match, giving three yellow cards and disallowing three goals. On 8 January 2022, she refereed the final of the 2021–22 Women's Supercoppa Italiana, Milan–Juventus 1–2.

On 1 July, she was promoted to Serie A. She was fourth official in Monza–Udinese on Matchday 3. Having already refereed two Coppa Italia and two Serie B matches, on 28 September she was designated to referee Sassuolo–Salernitana, which was played four days later, becoming the first woman to referee a Serie A match.

In early January 2023, she was included in the list of the match officials that were selected for the 2023 FIFA Women's World Cup in Australia and New Zealand. On 17 January, she refereed the Coppa Italia match between Napoli and Cremonese and was part for the first time in Italy to triad composed only by women.

References 

1990 births
Living people
People from Apulia
People from Tuscany
Italian football referees
University of Florence alumni
University of Pisa alumni
University of Bergamo alumni
21st-century Italian women
Women association football referees
Women's association football referees